Peter Wessel Wind Kildal (24 November 1814 – 22 March 1882) was a Norwegian merchant and industrialist.
 
Kildal was born at Borgund in  Møre og Romsdal, Norway. He was the son of Ole Severin Kildal and Karen Friis Wind. He was the brother of politician, Peter Daniel Baade Wind Kildal.

As a young man, Kildal went to Christiania (now Oslo) to apprentice  with Christian Benneche  who ran a general store. He opened his first merchantile store in Christiania in 1842. He gradually expanded other businesses into  P. W. W. Kildal & Co. At  Høyenhall in Østensjø, he owned the country's largest fruit plantation, at Hol in Ringsaker he owned a farm, a dairy and a potato flour factory. In 1863 he took over the Lilleborg Fabriker factory  which remained family operated until 1897. 

He was married to Christine Marie Gotaas (1817-1900) and was the father of Birger Kildal. His daughter Elen Lovise married Lauritz Birkeland, a son of bishop Peter Hersleb Graah Birkeland.

References

1814 births
1882 deaths
People from Møre og Romsdal
Norwegian business executives
Norwegian industrialists
Norwegian merchants
19th-century Norwegian businesspeople